Marcos Andrés González Salazar (born 9 June 1980) is a Brazilian born Chilean professional football defender.

Although born in Brazil, he moved to Santiago aged two and has Chilean citizenship. Noteworthy, he has scored in all the team which he has played.

A Chilean international, he has played during 2006 and 2014 World Cup qualifiers.

Club career
He professionally debuted in 1999 at Universidad de Chile, winning a league title that year whilst the following he achieved another league title and a cup title, all with César Vaccia as coach.

In 2003, González moved to Argentina’s Colón de Santa Fe, remaining there two seasons. After a brief spell at Palestino in the second half of 2005, in January 2006 season he chose to sign with the Columbus Crew over Universidad Católica. At the American team, he played two seasons and made 45 appearances, scoring two goals.

Following the 2008 MLS season, González was released from Columbus Crew and then joined the team which he failed to sign in 2006, Universidad Católica, where two years later won the 2010 Primera División title.

In 2011, it was confirmed that González returned to Universidad de Chile. However, he break out into first-team and was a key player in the treble obtention, after winning the Apertura and Clausura titles as well as the Copa Sudamericana.

In 2012, he joined Brazilian club Flamengo. There he helped the team to win the 2013 Copa do Brasil and he stayed at the Mengão until mid-2014. After being released from Flamengo, he returned his homeland and signed for Unión Española to play the 2014–15 Primera División season.

On 11 July 2015, he joined Mexican side Necaxa.

International career
He has represented Chile internationally 29 times.

International goals

Career statistics

1Cup competitions include the MLS Cup, Copa Chile, Copa do Brasil and Copa México
2Other tournaments include the Copa Libertadores and Copa Sudamericana.
3Other tournaments include the Campeonato Carioca.

Honours

Club
Universidad de Chile
 Primera División de Chile (4): 1999, 2000, 2011 Apertura, 2011 Clausura
 Copa Chile: 2000
 Copa Sudamericana: 2011

Universidad Católica
 Primera División de Chile: 2010

Flamengo
 Copa do Brasil: 2013

Individual
 Campeonato Nacional Team of the Season (2): 2009, 2011
 Conmebol Team of the Season: 2011

References

External links

Marcos González – Primera División Argentina statistics at Fútbol XXI 

1980 births
Living people
Footballers from Rio de Janeiro (city)
Brazilian emigrants to Chile
Citizens of Chile through descent
Chilean footballers
Chilean expatriate footballers
Chile international footballers
Universidad de Chile footballers
Rangers de Talca footballers
Club Atlético Colón footballers
Club Deportivo Palestino footballers
Columbus Crew players
Club Deportivo Universidad Católica footballers
CR Flamengo footballers
Unión Española footballers
Club Necaxa footballers
Chilean Primera División players
Argentine Primera División players
Major League Soccer players
Campeonato Brasileiro Série A players
Liga MX players
Chilean expatriate sportspeople in Argentina
Chilean expatriate sportspeople in the United States
Chilean expatriate sportspeople in Brazil
Chilean expatriate sportspeople in Mexico
Expatriate footballers in Argentina
Expatriate soccer players in the United States
Expatriate footballers in Brazil
Expatriate footballers in Mexico
Naturalized citizens of Chile
Association football defenders